Howard Garland (27 October 1937, Detroit) is an American mathematician, who works on algebraic groups, Lie algebras (structure theory and representation theory), and infinite-dimensional algebras.

Garland received in 1958 his bachelor's degree from the University of Chicago, in 1959 his master's degree from Wayne State University, and in 1964 his Ph.D. from the University of California, Berkeley under S. S. Chern with thesis On the cohomology of lattices in Lie groups). As a postdoc he was in 1964–1965 an instructor at Yale University and in 1965–1966 a visiting scholar at the Institute for Advanced Study. At Yale University he became in 1966 an assistant professor, in 1969 an associate professor, and in 1973 a full professor. Garland was a visiting professor in 1969–1970 at Columbia University and in 1972–1973 at the State University of New York at Stony Brook.

In 1986 Garland, with his doctoral student Igor Frenkel and with Gregg Zuckerman, applied Feigin's theory of semi-infinite cohomology of graded Lie algebras to explain some aspects of the BRST quantization of string theory.

Selected publications
with W. C. Hsiang: 
with M. Goto: 

with M. S. Raghunathan: 

with M. S. Raghunathan: 

with I. B. Frenkel and G. J. Zuckerman:

References

1937 births
Living people
20th-century American mathematicians
21st-century American mathematicians
University of Chicago alumni
Wayne State University alumni
University of California, Berkeley alumni
Yale University faculty
Institute for Advanced Study visiting scholars
Fellows of the American Mathematical Society